Melbourne Central may refer to:
Aurora Melbourne Central, a skyscraper currently under construction in Melbourne, Australia
Melbourne Central Shopping Centre, a shopping centre in Melbourne, Australia
Melbourne Central railway station, a railway station in Melbourne, Australia